The 1967 South American Rugby Championship was the fifth edition of the competition of the leading national Rugby Union teams in South America.

The tournament was played in Buenos Aires and won by Argentina.

Standings 

{| class="wikitable"
|-
!width=165|Team
!width=40|Played
!width=40|Won
!width=40|Drawn
!width=40|Lost
!width=40|For
!width=40|Against
!width=40|Difference
!width=40|Pts
|- bgcolor=#ccffcc align=center
|align=left| 
|2||2||0||0||56||6|||+50||4
|- align=center
|align=left| 
|2||1||0||1||16||29||−13||2
|- align=center
|align=left| 
|2||0||0||2||17||54||−37||0
|}

Results

References
  IRB – South American Championship 1967

1967
1967 rugby union tournaments for national teams
rugby union
rugby union
rugby union
International rugby union competitions hosted by Argentina